Neena Gupta (born in 1984) is a professor at the Statistics and Mathematics Unit of the Indian Statistical Institute (ISI), Kolkata. Her primary fields of interest are commutative algebra and affine algebraic geometry.

Life
Neena Gupta was previously a visiting scientist at the ISI and a visiting fellow at the Tata Institute of Fundamental Research (TIFR). She has won the Shanti Swarup Bhatnagar Prize for Science and Technology (2019) in the category of mathematical sciences, the highest honour in India in the field of science and technology. In 2022 she was awarded the Ramanujan award. She is the second woman from India who got this award.

Neena Gupta received the Indian National Science Academy Young Scientist award in 2014 for the solution she proposed to the Zariski Cancellation Problem. in positive characteristic. Her work on the conjecture had also earned her the inaugural Saraswathi Cowsik Medal in 2013, awarded by the TIFR Alumni Association. She is also the recipient of the DST-ICTP-IMU Ramanujan Prize for Young Mathematicians from Developing Countries in 2021.

Education 
Gupta graduated with honours in mathematics from Bethune College in 2006. She earned her post graduation in mathematics from the Indian Statistical Institute in 2008 and subsequently, her Ph.D. degree in 2011 with commutative algebra as her specialization under the guidance of Amartya Kumar Dutta. The title of her dissertation was "Some results on Laurent polynomial fibrations and Quasi A*-algebras".

Career

 Professor at Statistical and Mathematics Unit (SMU), ISI Kolkata (Jun 2014 -)
 INSPIRE Faculty at ISI Kolkata (Dec 2012 - Jun 2014)
 Visiting Fellow at TIFR Mumbai (May 2012 - Dec 2012)
 Visiting Scientist at ISI Kolkata (Feb 2012 - Apr 2012)
 Shyama Prasad Mukherjee Research Fellow at ISI Kolkata (Sep 2008 - Feb 2012)

Awards and honours
Invited speaker at the International Congress of Mathematicians (ICM) 2022
DST-ICTP-IMU Ramanujan Prize for Young Mathematicians from Developing Countries (2021)
Shanti Swarup Bhatnagar Prize for Science and Technology (2019)
The World Academy of Sciences Young Affiliates (2020)
Fellow of the Indian Academy of Sciences (2021)
 The Swarna Jayanti Fellowship Award, Department of Science and Technology (India) (2015)
 The inaugural Professor A. K. Agarwal Award for best research publication by the Indian Mathematical Society (2014)
 The Indian National Science Academy Young Scientist Award (2014)
 The Ramanujan Prize from the University of Madras (2014)
 Associateship of the Indian Academy of Sciences (2013)
 The Saraswathi Cowsik Medal by the TIFR Alumni Association for her work on the Zariski Cancellation Problem in positive characteristic (2013)
 Nari Shakti Puraskar on 8 March 2022

References

External links 

Living people
21st-century Indian women scientists
Indian women mathematicians
Bethune College alumni
Academic staff of the Indian Statistical Institute
21st-century Indian mathematicians
21st-century women mathematicians
1984 births
Women scientists from West Bengal